Pathiriyad is a census town in Kannur district in the Indian state of Kerala.

Transportation
The national highway passes through Thalassery town. Mangalore, Goa and Mumbai can be accessed on the northern side and Cochin and Thiruvananthapuram can be accessed on the southern side.  The road to the east of Iritty connects to Mysore and Bangalore.   The nearest railway station is Thalassery on Mangalore-Palakkad line. 
Trains are available to almost all parts of India subject to advance booking over the internet.  There are airports at Mangalore and Calicut. Both of them are international airports but direct flights are available only to Middle Eastern countries.

Demographics
As of 2011  Census, Pathiriyad had a population of 18,008 which constitute 46.4% males and 53.6% females. Average sex ratio was 1156 higher than state average of 1084. Pathiriyad has an average literacy rate of 96.2%, higher than the state average of 94%; male literacy was 98%, and female literacy was 95.3%. In Pathiriyad, 10.5% of the population is under 6 years of age.

References

Villages near Kuthuparamba
Cities and towns in Kannur district